Aholcocerus sevastopuloi is a moth in the family Cossidae. It is found in India.

References

Natural History Museum Lepidoptera generic names catalog

Moths described in 2011
Cossinae
Moths of Asia